Bob Hannah Stadium is a baseball stadium located at the University of Delaware in Newark, Delaware.  It plays host to the Delaware Fightin' Blue Hens baseball team.  The stadium's namesake, Bob Hannah, retired as head coach in 2000.  The stadium seats 1,300 people for baseball.  Features of the stadium include an enclosed press box, an outdoor batting cage, and banners on the outfield fence signifying Delaware's numerous conference titles and NCAA appearances.

The stadium underwent extensive renovations in 2014 that replaced the grass field with an artificial turf playing surface  It also added heated dugouts, new stadium fencing and backstop area, a three tunnel batting cage, a new scoreboard, and improved bullpens. The field dimensions are 330' down the right field line, 320' down the left field line, and 400' to center field.

See also
 List of NCAA Division I baseball venues

References

External links
 Delaware Blue Hens Baseball

College baseball venues in the United States
Baseball venues in Delaware
Buildings and structures in Newark, Delaware
Delaware Fightin' Blue Hens baseball
Sports venues completed in 2000
2000 establishments in Delaware